Andre Castro (born January 6, 1999) is an American racing driver. He was one of two drivers to win the prestigious Team USA Scholarship in 2021. He currently competes in the USF Juniors championship with International Motorsport. He previously competed in the U.S. F2000 National Championship in 2021 with Legacy Autosport.

Racing record

Career summary 

*Season still in progress.

Motorsports career results

American open-wheel racing results

U.S. F2000 National Championship 
(key) (Races in bold indicate pole position) (Races in italics indicate fastest lap) (Races with * indicate most race laps led)

USF Juniors 
(key) (Races in bold indicate pole position) (Races in italics indicate fastest lap) (Races with * indicate most race laps led)

*Season still in progress.

References 

1999 births
Living people
Racing drivers from New York City
Formula Ford drivers
U.S. F2000 National Championship drivers
NASCAR drivers
Newman Wachs Racing drivers

United States F4 Championship drivers